Badister ajax is a species of ground beetle that is in the genus Badister. Badister ajax was discovered by the scientist Britton in 1948 and is endemic to Yemen.

References

Beetles described in 1948
Endemic fauna of Yemen